Cannabis in Ethiopia is illegal, and possession of cannabis can result in up to 6 months imprisonment.

History
Smoking pipes uncovered in Ethiopia and carbon-dated to around 1320 CE were found to have traces of cannabis.

Shashamane
In the 1960s, Rastafari immigrants from the Caribbean began to settle on land near Shashamane which had been set aside for them by Emperor Haile Selassie I. Subsequently, Shashamane has become known for its cannabis cultivation, largely meant for local consumption.

References

Ethiopia
Politics of Ethiopia
Society of Ethiopia